Annette Kelm (born 1975 in Stuttgart, Germany) is a German contemporary artist and photographer who is particularly known as a conceptual artist. Kelm uses medium or large format cameras in her work, creating still life and portraits. She favours using analog photography methods in her work.

Kelm graduated from the Hochschule für bildende Künst in Hamburg in 2000, after which she moved to Berlin.

Work 
Kelm explores ideas through "baffling narratives" which use typology, patterns and the intersection of design and technology. Her work has been inspired by traditional photography genres such as the still life, landscapes and portraits. The New York Times describes her work as playing with "watered-down semiotics."

Exhibition History
 MoMA PS1 (The Gold Standard, 10/29/2006 - 01/15/2007)
 CCA Wattis Institute for Contemporary Art in San Francisco (PASSENGERS: 1.6 ANNETTE KELM, 02/06/2008 - 03/01/2008)
 Kunsthalle Zürich (Annette Kelm, 01/24/2009 - 04/26/2009)
 54th Venice Biennale (06/04/2011 - 11/27/2011)
 Museum of Modern Art (New Photography 2013, 09/14/2013 - 01/06/2014)
 Whitney Museum of American Art (Collected by Thea Westreich Wagner and Ethan Wagner, 11/20/2015 - 03/06/2016)
 VOX Centre de l'image contemporaine, Montreal, Quebec, Canada (Annette Kelm, 05/11/2016 - 06/25/2016)

Honours and awards
 1999 Kodak Young Photographers Award
 2004 Artist residency Heanavesi, Finland Working Grant for Fine Art, Hamburg
 2005 ART COLOGNE-Award for young art Working Grant of Stiftung Kunstfonds Travel-Grant Los Angeles
 2015 Camera Austria - Award for contemporary photography, Graz

Galleries 
 Andrew Kreps Gallery, New York, USA.
 Galerie Meyer Kainer, Vienna, Austria.
 Herald St Gallery, London, England.
 Johann König Gallery, Berlin, Germany.
 Marc Foxx Gallery, Los Angeles, CA, USA.

Collections 
Annette Kelm's work has been collected by the Centre Pompidou, Paris, the Guggenheim Museum, New York, the Kunstmuseum Stuttgart, Germany, and the Museum of Contemporary Art, Los Angeles.

See also
 List of German women artists

References

External links
 MoMA
 AIMIA | AGO Photography Prize

1975 births
Living people
Artists from Stuttgart
German women artists